Mahar is an Indian caste group.

Mahar may also refer to:

 Mahar (Pellucidar), a fictional species of reptile in Edgar Rice Burroughs' Pellucidar
 Mahar (surname), a Kumaoni-Khastriya Rajput surname used in Uttrakhand, Himachal Pradesh and West Nepal
 Mahar (tribe), a Sindhi tribe in Pakistan
 Mahar, an anglicization of the Irish surname Ó Meachair
 Mahar, the original name of the Israeli political party Democratic Choice
 Mahr, a gift given from a groom to a bride in an Islamic wedding ceremony